Timber Ridge Presbyterian Church is a historic Presbyterian church located near Lexington, Rockbridge County, Virginia. It was built in 1756, altered in 1871, and completely remodeled in 1899–1900.  It is a one-story, rectangular gray limestone building with a gable roof. Also on the property is the contributing church cemetery with tombstones dated as early as 1773.

It was listed on the National Register of Historic Places in 1969.

References

18th-century Presbyterian church buildings in the United States
Presbyterian churches in Virginia
Churches on the National Register of Historic Places in Virginia
Churches completed in 1756
Buildings and structures in Rockbridge County, Virginia
National Register of Historic Places in Rockbridge County, Virginia
Limestone churches in the United States
Stone churches in Virginia
1756 establishments in Virginia